Cyril Snedden (7 September 1893 – 16 January 1985) was a New Zealand cricketer. He played four first-class matches for Auckland in 1920/21.

Snedden, a solicitor in Auckland, also served as president of the New Zealand Rugby League.

See also
 List of Auckland representative cricketers

References

External links
 

1893 births
1985 deaths
New Zealand cricketers
Auckland cricketers
Cricketers from Auckland
Cyril